The Mokeiha–Zybinskoe peat railway is located in Yaroslavl Oblast, Russia.

Current status 
The Mokeiha–Zybinskoe narrow-gauge railway's first line was constructed in 1950, in the area of Nekouzsky District, Yaroslavl Oblast, from the village Oktyabr to the swamp peat fields. The peat railway was built for hauling milling peat and workers and operates year-round. A peat factory was opened and put into operation in 2015.

Rolling stock

Locomotives 
TU7 – № 0727, 0904, 0952, 1677, 2908, 3333
TU6D – № 0274
ESU2A – № 044, 268, 929, 999
Draisine – PD1 – № 781

Railway cars 
 Flatcar
 Tank car
 Tank car – fire train
 Passenger car PV40
 Open wagon for peat TSV6A
 Hopper car to transport track ballast

Work trains 
Snowplow
Crane KJU-O – № 8
Track laying cranes PPR2ma

Gallery

See also
LLC Bioenergy
Narrow-gauge railways in Russia
Gusevskoye peat railway

References and sources

External links 

 Official website LLC Mokeiha–Zybinskoe 
 Photo – project «Steam Engine» 
 «The site of the railroad» S. Bolashenko 

750 mm gauge railways in Russia
Railway lines opened in 1950
Rail transport in Yaroslavl Oblast